Félicie Marie, called Félicia Thierret, around 1814 – 1 May 1873 was a French comedian.

Life 
Born in Paris, after attending the Conservatoire national supérieur d'art dramatique, Thierret made her debut at the Comédie-Française as Suzanne in Le Mariage de Figaro by Beaumarchais. She was accepted as a boarder in 1832 but soon left the theatre to alternate between Parisian stages and tours in the provinces. The list of her engagements in Paris is impressive : Comédie-Française (in 1832 and 1841), Théâtre de l'Odéon (in 1839 and 1857), Théâtre du Palais-Royal (in 1848 and 1858), Théâtre des Bouffes-Parisiens (in 1867) and Théâtre des Menus-Plaisirs (in 1873).

She could have pursued the classical repertoire, but this probably did not suit her whimsical temperament. When she played Tartuffe at the Odéon in particular (as Dorine). As she grew older, she became overweight, which prompted her to turn – successfully – to the role of the old women. In 1858, she returned to the Théâtre du Palais-Royal, where her comic side could be expressed in comedies, vaudevilles and operettas. Charles Legrand described her as follows: "Massive, hommasse, a semi-busted nose, small mischievous eyes, a half-rare smile, the troupier step, the hâbleur gesture", quoted by Henry Lyonnet.

Eugène Hugot says of her: 

In 1873, while performing La Mariée de la rue Saint-Denis at the Théâtre des Menus-Plaisirs, she felt ill and went to bed, never to get up again and died of pneumonia contracted during the performances. The press widely praised an actress full of originality, verve and comic strength.

She was married to Jean-Baptiste Georgin. "In the town, Mme Thierret was cited for the exceptional regularity of her morals and the exemplary devotion she showed to her elderly mother. »

Roles 
 6 September 1850 –  by Eugène Labiche and Marc-Michel, Théâtre du Palais-Royal : La baronne de Flasquemont
 9 April 1851 –  by Labiche and Marc-Michel, Théâtre du Palais-Royal : Mme Chatchignon 
 16 October 1852 –  by Labiche and Marc-Michel, Théâtre du Palais-Royal : Mme Beaudeloche
 17 December 1852 –  by Labiche and Marc-Michel, Théâtre du Palais-Royal : Galathée 
 2 March 1853 – Les folies dramatiques by Dumanoir and Clairville, Théâtre des Variétés : Tromboline
 1855 – Le Bonheur de vivre aux champs, one act vaudeville by Henry Monnier, Théâtre du Palais-Royal : 
 26 March 1857 –  by Labiche, Albert Monnier and Édouard Martin, Théâtre du Palais-Royal : Norine 
 October 1857 –  Tartuffe by Molière, Théâtre de l’Odéon : Dorine 
 24 December 1858 –  by Labiche, Théâtre du Palais-Royal : Fleur-de-thé
 2 February 1861 – La Mariée du mardi gras by Lambert-Thiboust and Eugène Grangé, Théâtre du Palais-Royal 
 7 March 1862 –  by Labiche and Marc-Michel, Théâtre du Palais-Royal : Mme Champbaudet
 9 May 1863 – Le Brésilien, one-act comedy by Henri Meilhac and Ludovic Halévy, Théâtre du Palais-Royal : Mme Karadec  
 22 February 1864 – , by Labiche and Alfred Delacour, Théâtre du Palais-Royal : Léonida
 31 October 1866 – La Vie parisienne, opéra-bouffe in five acts Jacques Offenbach, libretto by Meilhac and Halévy, Théâtre du Palais-Royal : Mme de Quimper-Karadec  
 6 September 1867 –  by Labiche and Édouard Martin, Théâtre des Bouffes-Parisiens : Mme Legrainard  
 September 1868 – L'île de Tulipatan, opera-bouffe in one act by Jacques Offenbach, libretto by Henri Chivot and Alfred Duru, Théâtre des Bouffes-Parisiens : Théodorine  
 March 1869 – La Diva, opera-bouffe in three acts by Jacques Offenbach, libretto by Meilhac and Halévy, Théâtre des Bouffes-Parisiens : Mme Palestine 
 September 1869 – Le Rajah de Mysore, musical buffoonery in one act by Charles Lecocq, libretto by Chivot and Duru, Théâtre des Bouffes-Parisiens : Fisapour 
 December 1869 – La princesse de Trébizonde, opera-bouffe in three acts by Jacques Offenbach, libretto by Charles Nuitter and Étienne Tréfeu, Théâtre des Bouffes-Parisiens : Paola 
 December 1871 – , opéra-bouffe in three acts by Jacques Offenbach, libretto by Nuitter et Tréfeu, Théâtre des Bouffes-Parisiens : La Grande-Khane
 28 December 1871 : : La dame aux jambes d'azur, by Eugène Labiche : Mme Chatchignard, fairy tale in three acts by Clairville, Eugène Grangé and Victor Koning, Théâtre des Menus-Plaisirs
 1873 – Un clou chasse l'autre, Théâtre des Menus-Plaisirs
 April 1873 – La Mariée de la rue Saint-Denis, folie-vaudeville in three acts by Clairville, Grangé and Koning, Théâtre des Menus-Plaisirs

References

External links 

 Félicia Thierret on Les Archives du Spectacle
 Iconographie 

French stage actresses
French mezzo-sopranos
19th-century French actresses
French National Academy of Dramatic Arts alumni
Troupe of the Comédie-Française
1814 births
Actresses from Paris
1873 deaths
Deaths from pneumonia in France